Music Macro Language (MML) is a music description language used in sequencing music on computer and video game systems.

Background

Early automatic music generation functions were used in arcade games, which used many computer sounds. An example of an early popular Arcade game with music is The Circus from Exidy Corporation in 1977.

The boom in Japanese video games was heralded in 1978 by the appearance in Japanese game centers (Amusement arcades) of Space Invaders by Taito.

The music was all proprietary (closed source). The 1978 release of the Programmable interval timer by Intel was significant. The Intel 8253 Mode 3 Square Wave generator was used for music, in the Kit computer MZ-40K by SHARP Corporation, made in Japan at May 1978. Another Micro computer BASIC MASTER MB-6880(ja)  used a 5Bit D/A converter music automated reference signal. Also important was the development of a method to generate using BASIC software. The machine was assembled by Hitachi, Ltd. and made in Japan in September 1978.

The MZ-40K featured an open architecture and program sources, was therefore a kind of open source software.

Versions

Classical MML

The first commands for classical MML appeared in the internal architecture of the SP-1002 MONITOR IOCS and SP-5001 BASIC Operating Systems on the MZ-80K 8-bit computer. Made by SHARP Corporation at 1978 in Japan. It incorporated Intel 8253 hardware and memory mapped I/O. The sound-related BASIC Statements were MUSIC, TEMPO, and BEEP.

Syntax

Classical MML as used in BASIC is described here. "MML Commands" are supplied to the MUSIC statement. Notes are specified in a three-octave range. A song is a sequence of mono single tones.

"+" (or in some old code, "￣") indicates upper octave, "- " (or in some old code, "＿") indicates the lower octave. The characters "CDEFGAB" correspond to a scale ("Doremi Faso Lassi"). A semitone is indicated by following the note with a '#' character. The note names are followed by a tone length, indicated by a number from 0–9. Similarly, R indicates a rest, and is also followed by a number from 0-9 indicating length.
Sound length Internal value × TEMPO values.Tone length Demisemiquaver is 0 (SP-1002 Internal value is 1)- Whole note is 9 (SP-1002 Internal value is 32).
Music played on Call to $0030 SP-1002 IOCS program routine.

Statements TEMPO n is 1–9, the slowest 1.TEMPO 4 is similar T=120.

Example

Below is the popular Japanese song "tōryanse" written using MML in MZ-731 SHARP S-BASIC 1Z-007B (SP-5001 Upper compatible).
 10 TEMPO 4
 20 A$="E5R1E3R0D3R0E3R0E1R0D1R0-G4R1"
 30 B$="F3R0F1R0F1R0A3R0F1R0E1R0D1R0D1R0E5R0"
 40 C$="C3R0C1R0C1R0E3R0C1R0-B1R0C1R0-B1R0-A1R0-A1-B5R0"
 50 D$="E1R0E1R0E1R0E1R0E1R0E1R0D1R0E1R0E1R0E1R0D1R0-A1R0-A1R0B3R1"
 60 E$="-A1R0-B1R0C1R0D1R0E1R0F1R0E1R0F3R1A3R1B1R0A1R0F3R0E3R0E1R0E4R0"
 100 MUSIC A$+B$+B$
 110 MUSIC C$+C$+B$
 120 MUSIC C$+D$+E$

Modern MML

Modern MML originally appeared in Microsoft BASIC and was common in the early 1970s and 1980s on 8-bit and 16-bit era Japanese personal computers. The NEC PC-6001 included Microsoft BASIC and the Programmable Sound Generator in 1981. The MML was especially popular on NEC's personal computers, such as the NEC PC-8801. With the 2001 release of the mck (Music Creation Kit) software for compiling MML to play music on the Nintendo Entertainment System, awareness and use of MML increased. MML is presently popular among Japanese electronic musicians and musicians who create chiptunes as a way to write music for the Nintendo Entertainment System.

Syntax

Modern MML originated as a sub-language of BASIC, then generally included in ROM on micro-computers. A PLAY statement uses an argument to define a string of tones that the sound-chip played. MML code has a simple text format whereby letters and numbers are used to describe the musical notes to be played. In addition, various implementations of MML add system extensions allowing parameters of audio synthesis to be altered with specialized commands or to simplify the entry of common musical figures such as arpeggios.

Though many platforms feature custom extensions and letter case requirements and other minor syntactical features vary slightly in some implementations, the fundamental syntax rules, commands and features that define MML and are present in whole or in part in all implementations are as follows:

cdefgab — The letters a to g correspond to the musical pitches and cause the corresponding note to be played. Sharp notes are produced by appending a + or #, and flat notes by appending a -. The length of a note is specified by appending a number representing its length as a fraction of a whole note — for example, c8 represents a C eighth note, and f+2 an F♯ half note.
p — A pause or rest. Sometimes also r, although the original IBM and Microsoft BASIC used p, as do all clones (e.g. the Linux and BSD speaker devices). The length of the rest is specified in the same manner as the length of a note — for example, r1 produces a whole rest.
o — Followed by a number, o selects the octave the instrument will play in.
>, < — Used to step up or down one octave.
l — Followed by a number, specifies the default length used by notes or rests which do not explicitly define one. For example, l8 g a b g l16 g a b g produces a series of four eighth notes followed by a series of four sixteenth notes.
v — Followed by a number, sets the volume of the instrument. The range of values allowed is dependent upon the specific sound hardware being used. Some implementations also allow an ADSR envelope to be applied to the amplitude of each note.
t — Followed by a number, sets the tempo in beats per minute. On hardware with more than one sound channel, it is often possible to set each channel to a different tempo.

In addition to these, most implementations add their own keywords and symbols for system-specific enhancements or extensions.

Example

Below is a Modern MML transcription of Dance of the Cuckoos (with white-space for clarity, though some MML interpreters will require this to be stripped before playing).

t104
l4
>
c16f16
a>c8<a c16f16
a>c8<a c8
b-8>c8<b-8 g c8
a8>c8<a8 f c16f16
a>c8<a c16f16
a>c8<a c8
b-8>c8<b-8 g >c8
<f2

SMX 
Standard Musical eXpression (SMX) is a variant of Modern MML provided by Microsoft in QBASIC, BASICA, and GW-BASIC's  statement. The version used by GW-BASIC is part of the modern BSDs, FreeBSD, NetBSD, OpenBSD, and MirOS; see speaker(4) for the language.

Languages, platforms and software
 Epic Games's ZZT and Super ZZT, as well as the open-source clone named MegaZeux, use a very compact variant of MML for the PLAY command, with only one channel for the PC Speaker
 Microsoft's QBASIC, BASICA, and GW-BASIC all feature a PLAY statement which takes a string argument in the SMX format. The name "Music Macro Language" may originate with GW-BASIC, which provided a facility "to play music by embedding a music macro language into the string data type." The SBasic compiler from the German magazine DOS Extra, produced by DMV Widuch, offers the same PLAY command, and a few-line BASIC programme could be compiled into a small (few KiB) tool to play any MML files (often called *.PLY) given on the command line.
 Eric S. Raymond wrote a UNIX System V driver that offers /dev/speaker in a GW-BASIC-compatible format. It was subsequently ported to 386BSD and is present modern BSD operating systems.
 The NEC PC-8801's BASIC dialect, N88-BASIC, used MML in its PLAY statement, as did several other implementations of BASIC produced or sold by NEC.
 Chiptune composer Yuzo Koshiro created a heavily modified version. According to Koshiro, it "was more a BASIC-style language at first, but I modified it to be something more like Assembly. I called it ‘Music Love'. I used it for all the Bare Knuckle Games."<ref name="hg101_retro"> Reprinted from {{citation|title=Retro Gamer|issue=67|year=2009}}</ref>
 Various MML utilities were written for the NEC PC-9801 family of computers, including PMD (Professional Music Driver) by game composer Masahiro Kajihara (most commonly known as KAJA), which was used by composer Ryu Umemoto for games like EVE Burst Error and Grounseed, as well as by game developer ZUN for most of his first five Touhou Project'' games.
 The mck, pmck, and ppmck utilities for creating Nintendo Entertainment System music, and a number of other tools for creating music for other hardware, such as the Bandai WonderSwan, the NEC PC Engine, and the Sega Mega Drive.
 The xpmck utility for creating music for various systems, including the Sega Master System, Sega Game Gear, Sega Mega Drive, Nintendo Game Boy, and Commodore 64.
 Some cellular phones utilize MML as a ringtone format. The RTTTL ringtone language exhibits many of the characteristics of MML.
 An escape sequence was defined to allow terminal programs play music encoded in MML. Because of this music in MML is sometimes called ANSI Music.
 On the MSX computer system, the built-in MSX BASIC also uses MML with PLAY-command. Comma separated strings represent separate voice channels. Music hardware expansions such as MSX-Music, MSX-Audio and MSX-MIDI expand PLAY-command so that also FM-chips and external MIDI devices can be controlled through MML.
Sharp Pocket computer music routine PLAYX - MyArchive.Nihongo -> :ja:ポケットコンピュータの製品一覧.
Macrotune is a free MML editor available for Windows and OS X while also offering Shared libraries for software/game developers.
 FlopPI-Music (archived old documentation page) uses an extended format with a file header with metadata (such as Author, Title, etc.), a newline, and then one line for each staff, supporting multiple instruments, with bar lines. It's designed to output to up to eight 3½″ floppy disc drives on Raspberry Pi GPIO ports. It also contains a standalone MML parser and MusicXML exporter library and utility, tested with MuseScore, allowing easy debugging of especially mass-parallel MML files, score sheet printing (ideally after some minimal postprocessing, but the defaults are usually legible), etc. – Floppi-Music and MMLlib is Free Software written in pure Python.
 Petit Computer and SmileBASIC both offer BGMPLAY functions, which can either take a preset MML track or one provided as a string.
 An MMO called Mabinogi allows players to type MML code onto in-game music score scrolls which can then be played for everyone nearby to hear using an equipped instrument. Due to that social aspect, users often made their own MML versions of popular songs and uploaded them to fan sites. The game also teaches users the syntax via skill books, which doubled as a way to unlock a higher size limit when writing the code. ArcheAge MMO provides the same features.
 A Windows program called 3MLE was made by a Mabinogi user to assist in writing MML scrolls. The program functions similarly to an IDE, allowing the user to write, optimize, and test MML code for different instruments.

See also

 Chiptune
 Electronic music
 HTML5 audio
 MIDI
 Synthetic music mobile application format

References

Music notation file formats
Video game music file formats
Audio programming languages
Free audio software
Electronic music software
Video game music technology